The pomelo (Citrus maxima) is the largest citrus fruit from the family Rutaceae and the principal ancestor of the grapefruit. It is a natural, non-hybrid, citrus fruit, native to Southeast Asia. Similar in taste to a sweet grapefruit, the pomelo is commonly consumed and used for festive occasions throughout Southeast Asia. As with the grapefruit, phytochemicals in the pomelo have the potential for drug interactions.

Etymology and common names

According to the Oxford English Dictionary, the etymology of the word "pomelo" is uncertain. It may be derived from Dutch pompelmoes. Its botanical name, Citrus maxima, means "the biggest citrus". In English, the word "pomelo" (also spelt pummelo, pumelo, pomello, pommelo) has become the more common name, although "pomelo" has historically been used for grapefruit.

After introduction to Barbados by 'Captain Shaddock' of the East India Company (apparently Philip Chaddock, who visited the island in the late 1640s), the fruit was called "shaddock" in English. From there the name spread to Jamaica in 1696. The fruit is also known as jabong in Hawaii and jambola in varieties of English spoken in South Asia. In Nepali, it is known as "bhogate". In India, it is known as chakota in Kannada, and robab tenga in Assamese.

Description and uses 

The flowers — single or in clusters — are fragrant and yellow-white in color.

The fruit is large,  in diameter, usually weighing . It has a thicker rind than a grapefruit, and is divided into 11 to 18 segments. The flesh tastes like a mild grapefruit, with little of its common bitterness (the grapefruit is a hybrid of the pomelo and the orange). The enveloping membranes around the segments are chewy and bitter, considered inedible, and usually discarded. There are at least sixty varieties.
The fruit generally contains few, relatively large seeds, but some varieties have numerous seeds.

The juice is regarded as delicious, and the rind is used to make preserves or may be candied. In Brazil, the thick skin may be used for making a sweet conserve, while the spongy pith of the rind is discarded. In Sri Lanka, it is often eaten as a dessert, sometimes sprinkled with sugar. In large parts of Southeast Asia where pomelo is native, it is commonly eaten as a dessert, often sprinkled with salt or dipped in a salt mixture, but it may instead be made into salads. In the Philippines, a pink beverage is made from pomelo and pineapple juice.

The fruit may have been introduced to China around 100 BCE. In East Asia, especially in Cantonese cuisine, braised pomelo pith is used to make dishes that are high in fibre and low in fat.

Propagation and genetic diversity 

The seeds of the pomelo are monoembryonic, producing seedlings with genes from both parents, but they are usually similar to the tree they grow on and therefore pomelo is typically grown from seed in Asia. Citrus maxima is usually grafted onto other citrus rootstocks outside Asia to produce trees that are identical to the parent; high-quality varieties are propagated by air-layering or by budding onto favored rootstocks.

The physical and chemical characteristics of pomelo vary widely across South Asia.

Varieties

Non-hybrid pomelos 
 Dangyuja

Possible non-hybrid pomelos
 Banpeiyu

Hybrids

The pomelo is one of the original citrus species from which cultivated citrus fruits have been hybridized, others being citron, mandarin, and to a lesser extent, papedas and kumquat. In particular, the common orange is presumed to be a naturally occurring hybrid between the pomelo and the mandarin with the pomelo providing the larger size and greater firmness. The grapefruit was originally also presumed to be a naturally occurring hybrid of the pomelo and the mandarin; however, genome analysis conducted more than two centuries after this presumption was made shows that it is actually a backcrossed hybrid between a pomelo and a sweet orange which is why 63% of the grapefruit's genome comes from the pomelo. 

The pomelo is employed today in artificial breeding programs:
 The common sweet orange (Citrus × sinensis) is a pomelo × mandarin hybrid
 The bitter orange (Citrus × aurantium) is another pomelo × mandarin hybrid
 The tangelo is a hybrid between pomelo or grapefruit and any tangerine; it generally has a thicker skin than a tangerine and is less sweet
 'K–Early' ('Sunrise Tangelo')
 'Minneola tangelo': Bowen grapefruit × Dancy tangerine
 'Orlando' (formerly 'Take'): Bowen grapefruit × Dancy tangerine (pollen parent)
 'Seminole': Bowen grapefruit × Dancy tangerine
 'Thornton': tangerine × grapefruit, unspecified
 'Ugli fruit' (Jamaican tangelo): mandarin × grapefruit, probable (wild seedling)
 Grapefruit is a pomelo backcross: pomelo × sweet orange (see above)
 Forbidden fruit: another Caribbean pomelo/sweet orange cross
 'Nova': Clementine × Orlando tangelo cross
 The Oroblanco and Melogold grapefruits are hybrids between Citrus maxima and the grapefruit
 Mandelos: pomelo × mandarin
 Mato buntan: a variety in Taiwan
 Hyuganatsu is a pomelo hybrid
 Kawachi Bankan: ujukitsu x unidentified

Nutrition

Raw pomelo flesh is 89% water, 10% carbohydrates, 1% protein, and contains negligible fat (table). A 100-gram reference amount provides  of food energy, and is rich in vitamin C (73% of the Daily Value), with no other micronutrients in significant content (table).

Potential for drug interaction

Pomelo may cause adverse effects, similar to those caused by grapefruit and some other citrus fruits, through the inhibition of cytochrome P450-mediated metabolism of prescription drugs such as anti-hypertensives and anticoagulants.

Gallery

References

Citrus
Flora of tropical Asia
Plants used in Ayurveda
Fruit trees